Vietnamese architecture is the architectural style used in Vietnam through the process of historical development and the absorption and integration of regional and international architectures. Vietnamese-style architecture is formed according to the needs of living, sheltering from the sun and rain, and a place to return to after work. Vietnamese architecture is reflected in the works from communal houses, shrines, pagodas, temples, family churches, citadels, palaces and housing architecture.

Ancient architecture 
Ancient architecture in Vietnam had stilt houses (Vietnamese: nhà sàn) built with materials like wood and bamboo. Depictions of these houses are seen on Đông Sơn bronze drums. There are 2 types of houses with roofs curved up like a boat and roofs curved down like turtle shells. In the 2nd century BC, An Dương Vương built the Cổ Loa citadel with a spiral shape and was the first citadel built in Vietnam. Thus the name Cổ Loa, literally meaning "ancient spiral", cổ meaning ancient and loa meaning spiral.

Feudal architecture 

 
Vietnamese architecture has imported influences from China, during this period Vietnamese architecture was influenced by Buddhist architecture.

 Before the Ngô dynasty: When China invaded, the Chinese officials attempted to assimilate the natives, they melted bronze drums to get bronze, and assimilate the Lạc Việt people. The culture was gradually being assimilated and influenced more by Chinese culture. Military officers built ramparts and mansions; Chinese people immigrated to build houses with Chinese architecture.
 Lý dynasty: After Ngô Quyền won independence, opened a new era for the nation. Chinese architecture greatly influenced Vietnamese architecture. The palace was built of wood, roofed with white and blue glazed tiles. After the Lý dynasty took over, the dynasty oversaw many reforms and kept the peace, this caused the culture and the economy of Đại Việt to develop, allowing for Đại Việt to become prosperous. Imperial capital was moved to Thăng Long from Hoa Lư. Architecture during this time was more developed: ramparts built with stone and bricks; The palace's loft is made of tall, colored wood, and has curved tiled roofs with intricate and decorative statues of leaves, dragons, and phoenixes.
 Trần dynasty: Architecture used during this was similar to the architecture used by the Lý dynasty and developed further. It is still the architecture of three blocks of houses, including the tiền đường, thiên hương, Upper Palace, and garden and ornamental plants. The outstanding works that have survived until now are Bình Sơn Pagoda and Phổ Minh Pagoda.
 Hồ dynasty: The architecture was inherited from the Lý–Trần dynasties. The Hồ dynasty was short-lived, but developed one of the most outstanding examples of Vietnamese architecture, the Tây Đô citadel.
 Lê dynasty: Wooden palace architecture flourished, roofed with yellow and green glazed tiles. Folk art developed through carvings on communal houses and pagodas. Remaining outstanding works are Bảng Communal temple, Tây Phương Temple, Hội An ancient town. At this time, began to come into contact with Western culture.

 Nguyễn dynasty: Phú Xuân Imperial city (Imperial City of Huế) of bricks built with some influence of Western architecture and was a citadel with a moat around it. The palace's attic is brightly colored wooden, roofed with yellow and green glazed tiles. In the North, people build wooden or thatched houses. People in the Central and South region built rường houses.

Modern architecture 

Modern architecture of the Vietnamese people has been influenced by the West clearly, and at the same time, there has been the absorption and fusion of East–West architecture with its own identity to shape the architecture as it is today. 
 During the French colonial period: The French colonialists brought Western concepts and ideas into Vietnam. Cement began to be widely used. The outstanding works of Western architecture in Vietnam are the Hanoi Opera House, Notre Dame Cathedral. There are also some outstanding works of Vietnamese-French architecture such as Khải Định Tomb, Palace of An Định, Cửa Bắc Church, and the Vietnam National Museum of History.
 From independence to present: Vietnam borrows many architectural techniques and styles from many countries around the world and create many other unique new architectural styles.

Influences 

Chinese architecture has influenced Vietnamese architecture immensely and many other countries around China, including Japan and Korea. While there is a lot of influence in Vietnamese architecture, there are also a few differences with Chinese architecture. The dougong (Chinese: 斗拱; pinyin: dǒugǒng; lit. cap [and] block; Vietnamese: Đấu củng) is an important part of Chinese architecture, is rarely or not found in Vietnamese architecture starting from the Lý dynasty where Vietnamese architecture began to develop and innovate away from Chinese traditional architecture. Vietnamese architecture was also influenced by feng shui (Vietnamese: phong thủy), buildings were built according to the directions and stars. A good example of this was during the construction of the Imperial City of Huế. Geomancers were consulted to find a suitable location for the citiadel. The citadel was oriented to face the Hương River (Perfume River) to the southeast. This differs from Beijing's Forbidden City in which faces true south.

French architecture has also influenced Vietnamese architecture with many colonial buildings being built with Vietnamese architecture and French architecture. The imperial palace of Huế, has many buildings using French architectural techniques and styles.

Gallery

See also
 Vietnamese garden
 Tam quan
 Hòn non bộ
 Vietnamese communal temple

References

Architecture of Vietnam